RMF is a three-letter abbreviation that may refer to:

Computing
 Recover My Files, a data recovery application
 Reed–Muller canonical form
 Requirements Modeling Framework, an Eclipse Foundation project
 Resource Measurement Facility, a performance management component of the IBM z/OS Operating System
 Rich Music Format, a music file format defined by Beatnik
 Risk Management Framework, integrates information security and risk management for system development

Military
 Royal Munster Fusiliers
 Royal Munster Fusiliers (New Army), New Army divisions
 Royal Munster Fusiliers (Reserves)

Transport
 Marsa Alam International Airport (IATA 'RMF') International airport code
 Romford railway station, East London, United Kingdom

Other
 Finnish Kalo language, ISO 639-3 code rmf
 RMF FM, Polish radio station
 Rheingau Musik Festival, an international summer music festival in Germany
 Rotating magnetic field
 Rhodes Must Fall A campaign to remove the Rhodes statue from the UCT campus.